

Background
1. FC Köln finished the 2014–15 Bundesliga in 12th place, thus ensuring a place in the 2015–16 Bundesliga. The 2015–16 season is the 45th season for the club in the Bundesliga and the second season in their current spell. The percentage of possible seasons in the Bundesliga amounts to 84.9% for the club. At the start of the season the club was on 16th place in the German TV money table.

Review
After matchday 31 the club achieved the goal to play in the Bundesliga in the season 2016/2017 by avoiding relegation. The 2016/2017 season will be the third succeeding season in the Bundesliga for the club since the promotion in 2014. At the end of the season the club will climb in the German TV money table from 16th to the 14th place. Finishing on the 9th position was the best club finish in the Bundesliga since the 1991/1992 season. During the season 1. FC Köln overtook the clubs Hamburger SV and Borussia Mönchengladbach to become the fourth largest club in Germany with 78.518 members in May 2016. Worldwide the club is the 14th largest football club at the moment.

Players

Squad

 

Players who left the club during the 2015–16 season

Players who joined the club during the 2015–16 season

Transfers

In

Out

Season overview
<div align="left">

Competitions

Bundesliga

League table

Results summary

Results by round

Matches

DFB-Pokal

Statistics

Goalscorers

|}

Assists 

|}

By competition

Attendance figures
The average attendance in the 2015-2016 Bundesliga season was 48.676.
So the utilisation of the stadium amounts to 97.35%.

Disciplinary record

References

1. FC Köln seasons
Köln